The Howrah–Allahabad–Mumbai line officially known as Howrah–Prayagraj–Mumbai line is a railway line connecting Kolkata and Mumbai via Allahabad. The  railway line was opened to traffic in 1870. This railway line was  until 2004.

Sections
For more detailed study the cross-country line has been divided into smaller sections:
 Howrah–Bardhaman chord
 Grand Chord
 Bardhaman–Asansol section
 Asansol–Gaya section
 Gaya–Mughalsarai section
 Mughalsarai–Allahabad section
 Allahabad–Jabalpur section
 Jabalpur–Bhusaval section
 Bhusawal–Kalyan section
 Kalyan–Mumbai CST section

History
The first train in India traveled from Bombay to Thane on 16 April 1853. By May 1854, Great Indian Peninsula Railway's Bombay–Thane line was extended to Kalyan. It was extended to Khopoli via Palasdhari in 1855.  station was set up in 1860 and Pune connected in 1863. In Eastern India, construction of the Howrah–Delhi main line was completed and through connection between Delhi and Kolkata was established in 1865. The last link was the bridge across the Yamuna at Allahabad. In 1866 Bhusawal-Khandwa section was opened and GIPR also extended its operations to Nagpur. East Indian Railway, which had established the Howrah–Allahabad–Delhi line, opened the Allahabad–Jabalpur branch line in June 1867. GIPR connection over the Thull Ghat reached Jabalpur from Itarsi on 7 March 1870,  linking up with EIR track there from Allahabad, and establishing connectivity between Mumbai and Kolkata.

The Bengal Nagpur Railway was formed in 1887 for the purpose of upgrading the Nagpur Chhattisgarh Railway and then extending it via Bilaspur to Asansol, in order to develop a shorter Howrah–Mumbai route than the one via Allahabad. The Bengal Nagpur Railway main line from Nagpur to Asansol, on the Howrah–Delhi main line, was opened for goods traffic on 1 February 1891. It was only after Kharagpur was linked from the west and the south that it was connected to Howrah in 1900.

The opening of this track was part of the inspiration for the French writer Jules Verne's book Around the World in Eighty Days. At the opening ceremony, the Viceroy Lord Mayo concluded that "it was thought desirable that, if possible, at the earliest possible moment, the whole country should be covered with a network of lines in a uniform system."

Electrification
In August 1976, the New Delhi–Howrah route (via Grand Chord), and that includes the Howrah–Allahabad section of the Howrah–Allahabad–Mumbai line, was the first trunk route in the country to be completely electrified with AC traction. Electrification of Itarsi - Jabalpur - Allahabad was proposed in Railway Budget of 2011. The entire route was divided into sections and electrification was completed in parts. In March 2020, electrification of last remaining stretch betweek Katni Jn. and Satna was also done, thereby the Howrah Allahabad Mumbai route became completely electrified.

Speed limits
The line from Bhusawal to Mumbai is also classified as 'A' class. The Allahabad–Bhusawal sector is classified as 'B' class where trains can run up to 130 km/h.

Calcutta Mail
The Imperial Indian Mail (now called 12321 up /12322 down Howrah–Mumbai Mail via Jabalpur), running on this route, was possibly the first named train of Indian Railways. The Mumbai–Howrah Mail via Allahabad is called Calcutta Mail between Mumbai and Allahabad, and Mumbai Mail (some still call it by its old name, Bombay Mail) between Allahabad(Now Prayagraj) and Howrah.

Inspiration for writing
The Kolkata–Mumbai linkage, along with other events, inspired the French writer Jules Verne to write his book Around the World in Eighty Days.

References

External links

5 ft 6 in gauge railways in India
Rail transport in West Bengal
Rail transport in Jharkhand
Rail transport in Bihar
Rail transport in Uttar Pradesh
Rail transport in Madhya Pradesh
Rail transport in Maharashtra
Railway lines opened in 1870